Group D of the 2003 FIFA Women's World Cup was one of four groups of nations, consisting of Australia, China PR, Ghana and Russia. It began on September 21 and ended on September 28. Most matches were played at The Home Depot Center in Carson, save the last two that were played at PGE Park in Portland. China PR topped the group despite their lackluster performances, followed to the next round by Russia. Australia and Ghana didn't make the second round.

Standings

Matches
All times local (PDT/UTC–7)

Australia vs Russia

China PR vs Ghana

Ghana vs Russia

China PR vs Australia

Ghana vs Australia

China PR vs Russia

References

External links
2003 FIFA Women's World Cup Group D

Group
Australia at the 2003 FIFA Women's World Cup
2003 in Chinese football
2003 in Russian football
Group